HD 65216 b is an extrasolar planet located approximately 115 light-years away in the constellation of Carina, orbiting the star HD 65216. This planet was discovered by the Geneva Extrasolar Planet Search Team in 2003. Like most planet candidates so far, it was detected with the radial velocity method.

The planet has a minimum mass about 30% more than Jupiter. Since the discovery method gives only the minimum mass, its true mass is probably larger than this. The planet orbits the star in an eccentric orbit and takes 577 days to complete one orbit.

References

External links
 
 
 

Carina (constellation)
Exoplanets discovered in 2003
Giant planets
Exoplanets detected by radial velocity